South Church railway station was on the Stockton and Darlington Railway.

History
The first section of the Bishop Auckland and Weardale Railway, from a junction with the Stockton and Darlington Railway near  and including the  Shildon Tunnel, opened as far as South Church (also known as St Andrew Auckland) in January 1842.

Trains on the present-day Tees Valley Line pass the site of the station.

Routes

References

External links
 Site of South Church Station on navigable 1948 O.S. map

Disused railway stations in County Durham
Railway stations in Great Britain opened in 1842
Railway stations in Great Britain closed in 1845